The Bird Can't Fly is a 2007 Dutch-South African-Irish drama film directed by Threes Anna and starring Barbara Hershey.

Cast
Barbara Hershey as Melody
Yusuf Davids as River
Tony Kgoroge as Scoop
John Kani as Stone

References

External links
 
 

2007 drama films
2000s English-language films
South African drama films
Dutch drama films
Irish drama films
English-language Dutch films
English-language Irish films
English-language South African films